Ernst Good (born 14 January 1950) is a former Swiss alpine skier. At the 1976 Winter Olympics, Good won the silver medal in giant slalom. He is the brother of Olympian Rita Good.

References

Sports Reference profile

1950 births
Swiss male alpine skiers
Alpine skiers at the 1976 Winter Olympics
Olympic alpine skiers of Switzerland
Olympic medalists in alpine skiing
Olympic silver medalists for Switzerland
Living people

Medalists at the 1976 Winter Olympics